In geometry, a surface  is ruled (also called a scroll) if through every point of  there is a straight line that lies on .  Examples include the plane, the lateral surface of a cylinder or cone, a conical surface with elliptical directrix, the right conoid, the helicoid, and the tangent developable of a smooth curve in space.

A ruled surface can be described as the set of points swept by a moving straight line.  For example, a cone is formed by keeping one point of a line fixed whilst moving another point along a circle. A surface is doubly ruled if through every one of its points there are two distinct lines that lie on the surface.  The hyperbolic paraboloid and the hyperboloid of one sheet are doubly ruled surfaces. The plane is the only surface which contains at least three distinct lines through each of its points .

The properties of being ruled or doubly ruled are preserved by projective maps, and therefore are concepts of projective geometry. In algebraic geometry, ruled surfaces are sometimes considered to be surfaces in affine or projective space over a field, but they are also sometimes considered as abstract algebraic surfaces without an embedding into affine or projective space, in which case "straight line" is understood to mean an affine or projective line.

Definition and parametric representation 

A two dimensional differentiable manifold is called a ruled surface if it is the union of one parametric family of lines. The lines of this family are the generators of the ruled surface.

A ruled surface can be described by a parametric representation of the form
 (CR) .
Any curve  with fixed parameter  is a generator (line) and the curve  is the directrix of the representation. The vectors  describe the directions of the generators.

The directrix may collapse to a point (in case of a cone, see example below).

Alternatively the ruled surface (CR) can be described by
 (CD) 

with the second directrix .

Alternatively, one can start with two non intersecting curves  as directrices, and get by (CD) a ruled surface with line directions 

For the generation of a ruled surface by two directrices (or one directrix and the vectors of line directions) not only the geometric shape of these curves are essential but also the special parametric representations of them influence the shape of the ruled surface (see examples a), d)).

For theoretical investigations representation (CR) is more advantageous, because the parameter  appears only once.

Examples

Right circular cylinder 

:

with

Right circular cone 

:

with 

For any cone one can choose the apex as the directrix. This case shows: The directrix of a ruled surface may degenerate to a point.

Helicoid 

The helicoid is a special case of the ruled generalized helicoids.

Cylinder, cone and hyperboloids 

The parametric representation 

has two horizontal circles as directrices. The additional parameter  allows to vary the parametric representations of the circles. For
 one gets the cylinder , for
 one gets the cone  and for
 one gets a hyperboloid of one sheet with equation  and the semi axes .

A hyperboloid of one sheet is a doubly ruled surface.

Hyperbolic paraboloid 

If the two directrices in (CD) are the lines 

one gets 
,
which is the hyperbolic paraboloid that interpolates the 4 points  bilinearly.

Obviously the ruled surface is a doubly ruled surface, because any point lies on two lines of the surface.

For the example shown in the diagram: 
.
The hyperbolic paraboloid has the equation .

Möbius strip 

The ruled surface
 
with  
 (circle as directrix),

contains a Möbius strip.

A simple calculation shows  (see next section). Hence the given realization of a Möbius strip is not developable. But there exist developable Möbius strips.

Further examples 
 Conoid
 Catalan surface
 Developable rollers (oloid, sphericon)

Tangent planes, developable surfaces  
For the considerations below any necessary derivative is assumed to exist.

For the determination of the normal vector at a point one needs the partial derivatives of the representation  :
 , 
Hence the normal vector is 

This is possible only, if the three vectors  lie in a plane, i.e. they are linearly dependent. The linear dependency of three vectors can be checked using the determinant of these vectors:

The tangent planes along the line  are equal, if 
 

The importance of this determinant condition shows the following statement:
A ruled surface  is developable into a plane, if for any point  the Gauss curvature vanishes. This is exactly the case if 
 
at any point is true.

The generators of any ruled surface coalesce with one family of its asymptotic lines. For developable surfaces they also form one family of its lines of curvature. It can be shown that any developable surface is a cone, a cylinder or a surface formed by all tangents of a space curve.

Application and history of developable surfaces 

The determinant condition for developable surfaces is used to determine numerically developable connections between space curves (directrices). The diagram shows a developable connection between two ellipses contained in different planes (one horizontal, the other vertical) and its development.

An impression of the usage of developable surfaces in Computer Aided Design (CAD) is given in  Interactive design of developable surfaces

A historical survey on developable surfaces can be found in Developable Surfaces: Their History and Application

Ruled surfaces in algebraic geometry

In algebraic geometry, ruled surfaces were originally defined as projective surfaces in projective space containing a straight line through any given point. This immediately implies that there is a projective line on the surface through any given point, and this condition is now often used as the definition of a ruled surface: ruled surfaces are  defined to be abstract projective surfaces satisfying this condition that there is a projective line through any point. This is equivalent to saying that they are birational to the product of a curve and a projective line. Sometimes a ruled surface is defined to be one satisfying the  stronger condition that it has a fibration over a curve with fibers that are projective lines. This excludes the projective plane, which has a projective line though every point but cannot be written as such a fibration.

Ruled surfaces appear in the Enriques classification of projective complex surfaces, because every algebraic surface of Kodaira dimension  is a ruled surface (or a projective plane, if one uses the restrictive definition of ruled surface). 
Every minimal projective ruled surface other than the projective plane is the projective bundle of a 2-dimensional vector bundle over some curve. The ruled surfaces with base curve of genus 0 are the Hirzebruch surfaces.

Ruled surfaces in architecture
Doubly ruled surfaces are the inspiration for curved hyperboloid structures that can be built with a latticework of straight elements, namely:
 Hyperbolic paraboloids, such as saddle roofs.
 Hyperboloids of one sheet, such as cooling towers and some trash bins.

The RM-81 Agena rocket engine employed straight cooling channels that were laid out in a ruled surface to form the throat of the nozzle section.

References 

 Do Carmo, Manfredo P. : Differential Geometry of Curves and Surfaces, Prentice-Hall; 1 edition, 1976 
 

.  Review: Bulletin of the American Mathematical Society 37 (1931), 791-793, 
.
.
 .

.  Review: Séquin, Carlo H. (2009), Journal of Mathematics and the Arts 3: 229–230,

External links
 
 Ruled surface pictures from the University of Arizona
 Examples of developable surfaces on the Rhino3DE website

Surfaces
Differential geometry
Differential geometry of surfaces
Complex surfaces
Algebraic surfaces
Geometric shapes
Analytic geometry